Chamco (Chinese: 长所; Pinyin: Chángsǒ) is a village and township (村) in Tingri County, Tibet Autonomous Region of China.

Location 
It lies at an altitude of 4,255 metres (13,963 feet). It has authority over the village committees of ten different villages, including Senga Village, Gurong Village, and Chajiang Village, among others. Senga Village is where the administrative offices for the township are located.

See also
List of towns and villages in Tibet

Notes

Populated places in Shigatse
Township-level divisions of Tibet
Tingri County